Burton Township, Illinois may refer to one of the following places:

 Burton Township, Adams County, Illinois
 Burton Township, McHenry County, Illinois

See also

Burton Township (disambiguation)

Illinois township disambiguation pages